The Laughlin River Lodge (formerly Sam's Town Gold River, Gold River and River Palms) is a hotel and casino on the banks of the Colorado River in Laughlin, Nevada. It is owned and operated by Richard Craig Estey (Nevada Restaurant Services). The property includes a  casino and 1,000 hotel rooms in a 25-story tower. The resort has 653 slot machines and a bingo parlor.

History

The resort was created by Las Vegas real estate developer John Midby. It opened in 1984 as Sam's Town Gold River, later shortened to Gold River. A 25-story, 778-room hotel tower was opened in May 1990, and the gaming facilities were also expanded. Boyd Gaming operated the property until their contract was ended in March 1991.

Gold River filed for Chapter 11 bankruptcy protection in 1996. Businessman Allen Paulson took ownership of the reorganized company a year later, having paid an estimated $28 million for the property's $90 million in debt. It was quietly renamed as the River Palms in June 1998 and held a grand opening that October. The hotel underwent a major renovation in 1999.

Paulson died in 2000 and Columbia Sussex bought the property from his estate in 2004. After Columbia's gaming businesses went into bankruptcy, Tropicana Entertainment emerged in March 2010 with most of the company's casinos, including the River Palms.

In May 2013, Tropicana agreed to sell the River Palms for $7 million to M1 Gaming, owner of Boomtown Reno, but the sale never went through. In September 2014, Tropicana sold the River Palms for $6.75 million to Nevada Restaurant Services, and it was renamed as the Laughlin River Lodge.

References

External links
 
 

1984 establishments in Nevada
Casino hotels
Casinos completed in 1984
Casinos in Laughlin, Nevada
Hotel buildings completed in 1984
Hotels established in 1984
Hotels in Laughlin, Nevada
Resorts in Laughlin, Nevada